Desirée Cordero Ferrer (born 13 September 1993) is a Spanish model and beauty pageant titleholder who was crowned Miss Universe Spain 2014. She represented Spain at the Miss Universe 2014 in the United States where she made the top ten.

Early life
Cordero is successful model in Spain. In 2016 and 2017 she dated Portuguese footballer Cristiano Ronaldo.

Pageantry

Miss Universe Spain 2014
Cordero was crowned as Miss Universe Spain 2014 on October 28, 2014, by outgoing titleholder Patricia Yurena Rodríguez.

Miss Universe 2014
Cordero represented her country in the Miss Universe 2014. She competed with 87 women and placed as a Top 10 semi-finalist.

References

External links
 Official website

Spanish female models
1993 births
Living people
Miss Universe 2014 contestants
Spanish beauty pageant winners